Özge Törer (born 16 August 1998) is a Turkish actress known for her role as Bala Hatun in the Turkish TV series Kuruluş Osman, in which she stars alongside Burak Özçivit. Törer was born in 1998 in İzmir, Turkey. She lived in Silivri, Turkey, until she finished high school, upon after she went to Mugla Sitki Kocman University where she won an award for her role in a stage show. Özge, who previously only appeared as a host in a small television show, won two awards for Best Actress of the Year in 2021, (one at the Crystal Globe Awards) for her role as Bala Hatun.

Filmography

References

External links
 
 

1998 births
Living people
Turkish actresses